Jad Ghosn (born 23 August 1986) is a Lebanese left-leaning journalist and news reporter. He worked for OTV from 2012 to 2013 and Al Jadeed from 2013 to 2020.

In 2020, he signed a contract with Saudi-owned Asharq tv channel, but he was discharged because of older comments criticizing the Saudi government and the House of Saud. He has been working since then independently on his YouTube channel.

In May 2022, he lost the Lebanese parliamentary elections to the Lebanese Forces candidate Razi El Hage.

References

External links 
 
 YouTube channel

1986 births
Lebanese journalists
21st-century journalists
Living people